The Hatoyama family is a prominent Japanese political family which has been called "Japan's Kennedy family." Ichirō Hatoyama and Yukio Hatoyama served as a Prime Minister of Japan from 1954 to 1956 and from 2009 to 2010, respectively.

Family tree

References